Temirlan "Tima" Mukhtarovich Yerzhanov (born May 28, 1996) is a Kazakhstani ice dancer. With his skating partner, Maxine Weatherby, he is the 2020 Kazakhstani national champion and the 2019 Denis Ten Memorial Challenge bronze medalist. They competed in the final segment at the 2020 Four Continents Championships.

Personal life 
Yerzhanov was born on May 28, 1996 in Almaty, Kazakhstan. He has a sister. When Yerzhanov was 15 years old, he moved to the United States to train. He works at a skating coach at Palm Beach Ice Works in West Palm Beach, where he also trains.

Yerzhanov enjoys cooking and wants to enter the restaurant business after retiring from skating. He also enjoys reading history books, particularly about Genghis Khan. Yerzhanov plays ice hockey recreationally and was invited to join an amateur league in Florida, but declined due to injury concerns.

Career

Early career 
Yerzhanov began skating in 2004. As a men's singles skater, he was the 2012 Kazakhstani junior national champion. Yerzhanov began competing in ice dance during the 2014–15 season. Representing Kazakhstan with American Rebecca Dawn Lucas, they competed in one Junior Grand Prix event. Yerzhanov switched partners in 2015–16 and competed with Hannah Grace Cook of the United States for two seasons representing Kazakhstan. Cook/Yerzhanov were the 2016 Kazakhstani national bronze medalists and competed at two World Junior Championships (2016, 2017), placing 27th and 22nd, respectively. During the 2017–18 season, Yerzhanov struggled to find a partner and considered retiring.

Yerzhanov teamed up with Maxine Weatherby, also American, to continue representing his native country in July 2018. They had previously known each other while training in Coral Springs, Florida and tried out on the suggestion of Weatherby's mother. Weatherby/Yerzhanov train under Evgeni Platov in West Palm Beach and John Kerr in Pembroke Pines.

During their first season together in 2018–19, Weatherby/Yerzhanov won the silver medal at the 2019 Kazakhstani Championships behind Gaukhar Nauryzova / Boyisangur Datiev and finished eighth at the Bavarian Open.

2019–2020 season 
Weatherby/Yerzhanov opened their season at the Lake Placid Ice Dance International, where they placed 12th. They then finished eighth at the 2019 CS U.S. Classic. At the Denis Ten Memorial Challenge in October, Weatherby/Yerzhanov won their first international medal, bronze behind Germans Katharina Müller / Tim Dieck and Adelina Galyavieva / Louis Thauron of France. They also earned the technical minimums to compete at the 2020 Four Continents Championships and 2020 World Championships. After the event, Yerzhanov said he had always "dreamed of skating in Kazakhstan" and competing in front of his family. Weatherby/Yerzhanov won the national title at the 2020 Kazakhstani Championships.

At Four Continents, Weatherby/Yerzhanov were 16th in the rhythm dance and 15th in the free dance to finish 16th overall. The World Championships were cancelled due to the COVID-19 pandemic. During the ensuing lockdown, Weatherby/Yerzhanov trained separately for a time due to rinks being closed in Florida, before eventually meeting up to practice lifts off-ice. To earn income, Yerzhanov worked as a personal trainer for a Russian family before it was deemed too high risk and went grocery shopping for the elderly.

2020–2021 season 
There were limited competition opportunities due to the pandemic. Weatherby/Yerzhanov plan to compete at the 2021 World Championships if they are not cancelled, but were missing from the initial entry list.

Programs

With Weatherby

With Cook

With Lucas

Competitive highlights 
CS: Challenger Series; JGP: Junior Grand Prix

Ice dance with Weatherby

Ice dance with Cook

Ice dance with Lucas

Men's singles

Detailed results 
ISU Personal Bests highlighted in bold.

 With Weatherby

References

External links 
 
 
 
 

1996 births
Living people
Kazakhstani male ice dancers
Sportspeople from Almaty
Kazakhstani emigrants to the United States